Pseudopyrausta marginalis is a moth in the family Crambidae. It was described by Harrison Gray Dyar Jr. in 1914. It is found in Panama and North America, where it has been recorded from Alaska, Quebec, Texas and Wisconsin.

The wingspan is 14–15 mm. Adults are on wing from May to November.

References

Moths described in 1914
Pyraustinae